The 2011 Asian Women's Hockey Champions Trophy was the 2nd edition of the Women's Asian Champions Trophy, a biennial women's international field hockey tournament organized by the Asian Hockey Federation. The tournament was held alongside the men's tournament in Ordos, China from 4 to 10 September 2011.

The top four Asian teams (China, India, Japan, and South Korea) participated in the tournament which involved round-robin league among all teams followed by play-offs for final positions.

Umpires
Five umpires were selected to officiate at the tournament:

Neutral Umpires
Caroline Brunekreef (NED)

Umpires
Nirmla Dagar (IND)
Nor Piza Hassan (MAS)
Kang Hyun-young (KOR)
Liu Xiaoying (CHN)

Results
All times are China Standard Time (UTC+8)

Round robin

Classification

Third place game

Final

Final standings

See also
2011 Men's Asian Champions Trophy

References

Women's Asian Champions Trophy
Asian Champions Trophy
Asian Champions Trophy
International women's field hockey competitions hosted by China
Asian Champions Trophy
Ordos City